The Foul Play Mixtape is a mixtape by rapper Diabolic, released October 2006. It was produced by Engineer, Shuko, DJ Mentat, Daneja, and Asthmatik. Diabolic expresses his satirical social standpoint, societal frustrations, and semi-socio/political perspectives showcasing his fiery passion with unique graphic wordplay.

Track listing

References 

2007 mixtape albums
Diabolic (rapper) albums